Tele may refer to:

 Television 
 Tele (band), a German rock/pop band
 Tele Ikuru, Deputy Governor of Rivers State
 Télé, Mali, a rural commune of the Cercle of Goundam in the Tombouctou Region of Mali
 Telemarketing
 Telegraphy
 Evening Telegraph (Dundee), a local newspaper in Dundee, Scotland
 Fender Telecaster, a guitar
 Lake Tele, Republic of the Congo
 Telemark skiing, a style of skiing 
 Tiele people, an ancient Turkic tribal confederation
 Tele (footballer) (born 1990), Brazilian footballer